Syed Zakir Hussain Shah (28 January 1951 – 3 June 2017) born in village Hayal Tehsil and district, Rawalpindi. He was an England-based Pakistani politician, former Member of Provincial Assembly from Rawalpindi, Punjab and a former member of the Council of Islamic Ideology of the Government of Pakistan. He died on 3 June 2017 at Shifa International Hospital Pakistan, due to organ failure.

Sources 
 http://www.dailytimes.com.pk/default.asp?page=2010%5C01%5C13%5Cmain_13-1-2010_pg11
 http://al-huda.al-khoei.org/news/124/ARTICLE/1108/2005-01-01.html
 http://criticalppp.com/archives/12863
 http://www.paklinks.com/gs/all-views/261886-what-in-pakistan-are-you-proud-of-3.html
 http://www.pakpassion.net/ppforum/showthread.php?p=1129729
 http://defenceforumindia.com/china-pakistan-defence/9104-persecution-minorities-pakistan-3.html

External links 
 http://www.shiachat.com/forum/index.php?/topic/234968038-stop-target-killing-of-shiite-community/

1951 births
2017 deaths
Arabic–Urdu translators
Linguists from Pakistan
Pakistani translators
Pakistan People's Party politicians
Pakistani expatriates in England
People from Rawalpindi District
Punjabi people
Urdu–Arabic translators
University of the Punjab alumni
20th-century translators